This is an alphabetical list of notable baseball players from the Dominican Republic who have played in Major League Baseball since . Players in bold are still active in MLB, as of 2022.

Since 1956 a large number of baseball players of Dominican origin have played in Major League Baseball in the United States, with the Dominican Republic being the second country in the world after the United States with the most current baseball players in MLB.


A

Fernando Abad
Albert Abreu
Bryan Abreu
Juan Abreu
Tony Abreu
Winston Abreu
Domingo Acevedo
José Acevedo
Cristhian Adames
Willy Adames
Joan Adon
Gibson Alba
Hanser Alberto
Al Alburquerque
Jorge Alcalá
Santo Alcalá
Arismendy Alcántara
Izzy Alcántara
Raúl Alcántara
Sandy Alcántara
Sergio Alcántara
Victor Alcántara
Manny Alexander
Antonio Alfonseca
Carlos Almanzar
Abraham Almonte
Edwin Almonte
Erick Almonte
Héctor Almonte
Miguel Almonte
Zoilo Almonte
Felipe Alou
Jesús Alou
Matty Alou
Moisés Alou
Darío Álvarez
Pedro Álvarez
Joaquín Andújar
Luis Andújar
Miguel Andújar
Aristides Aquino
Greg Aquino
Jayson Aquino
Pedro Araújo
Alberto Árias
Joaquín Arias
Jonathan Aro
José Arredondo
Jairo Asencio
Miguel Asencio
Ezequiel Astacio
Pedro Astacio
Abiatal Avelino
Erick Aybar
Manny Aybar
Willy Aybar

B

Benito Báez
José Báez
Pedro Báez
Sandy Báez
Lorenzo Barceló
Luis Barrera
Antonio Bastardo
Miguel Batista
Rafael Batista
Tony Batista
Danny Bautista
Denny Bautista
Félix Bautista
Gerson Bautista
José Bautista (OF/3B)
José Bautista (P)
Rafael Bautista
Pedro Beato
George Bell
Juan Bell
Rafael Belliard
Ronny BelliardBrayan BelloFrancis Beltrán
Adrián Beltré
Engel Beltré
Esteban Beltré
Omar Beltré
Armando Benítez
Joaquín Benoit
Juan Bernhardt
Ángel Berroa
Gerónimo Berroa
Dellin Betances
Wilson Betemit
Randor BierdRonel BlancoTony Blanco
Emilio BonifacioJorge BonifacioLisalverto Bonilla
Pedro Borbón
Pedro Borbón Jr.
Rafael BournigalHuascar BrazobánYhency Brazobán
Lesli Brea
Bernardo Brito
Eude Brito
Jorge Brito
Juan Brito
Julio Borbón
Erick Perea
Socrates Brito
Tilson BritoVidal BrujánAmbiorix Burgos

C

César Cabral
Alberto Cabrera
Daniel Cabrera
Edwar CabreraEdward CabreraFrancisco Cabrera
Génesis Cabrera
José Cabrera
Mauricio Cabrera
Melky Cabrera
Orlando Calixte
Napoleón Calzado
Arquimedes CamineroJeimer CandelarioLuis Campusano
Silvestre Campusano
José CanóRobinson CanóJosé Capellán
Ramón Caraballo
Héctor Carrasco
Joel Carreño
Rico Carty
Alexi Casilla
Santiago Casilla
Carlos Casimiro
Alberto Castillo
Braulio Castillo
Carmen CastilloDiego CastilloFabio CastilloIván CastilloJuan Castillo
Lendy Castillo
Luis Castillo (2B)Luis Castillo (P), born 1992Luis Castillo (P), born 1995Manny Castillo
Welington Castillo
Wilkin Castillo
Ángel Castro
Bernie Castro
Bill Castro
Fabio CastroMiguel CastroRodolfo CastroSimón Castro
Starlin Castro
Willi Castro 
José Ceda
Andújar Cedeño
César Cedeño
Domingo Cedeño
Robinson ChecoGilberto CelestinoPedro Ciriaco
José Cisnero
Emmanuel Clase
Maikel Cleto
Pasqual CocoÁlex ColoméJesús Colomé
Bartolo Colón
Román Colón
José Constanza
Carlos ContrerasRoansy ContrerasDaniel CorcinoFranchy CorderoFrancisco Cordero
Jimmy CorderoNarciso CrookFrancisco Cruceta
Deivi Cruz
Enrique Cruz
Fausto Cruz
Juan Cruz
Nelson Cruz (P)Nelson Cruz (OF)Oneil CruzRhiner Cruz
Víctor CruzJosé CuasJohnny CuetoD

Alejandro De AzaÁngel De JesúsBryan De La Cruz 
Frankie de la Cruz
Joel De La Cruz
Eury De La Rosa
Francisco de la Rosa
Rubby De La Rosa
Jesús de la Rosa
Tomás de la Rosa
Jorge de León
Abel De Los Santos
Enyel De Los Santos
Fautino de los Santos
Luis de los Santos (IF)
Luis de los Santos (P)
Ramón de los Santos
Valerio de los SantosYerry De Los SantosMiguel Del Pozo
Jorge DePaula
Samuel Deduno
Arturo DeFreites
José DeLeón
Wilson Delgado
José de Paula
Julio DePaula
César DevarezJosé DeversRafael DeversFélix Díaz
Joselo Díaz
Juan Díaz
Jumbo DíazMiguel DíazLewin DíazRobinzon Díaz
Víctor DíazYainer DíazYennsy DíazWilmer DifoMarcos DiplánMiguel Diloné
Rafael Dolis
Freddy Dolsi
José Dominguez
Juan Dominguez
 Seranthony DomínguezOctavio DotelCamilo DovalMariano DuncanEzequiel DuránJhoan DuránRoberto Durán

E

Angelo Encarnación
Edwin EncarnaciónJerar EncarnaciónJuan Encarnación
Luis Encarnación
Mario Encarnación
Juan Espino
Nino EspinosaRaynel EspinalSantiago EspinalCarlos EstévezLeo Estrella
Tony Eusebio

FJeurys FamiliaCarlos Febles
Junior FélixMichael FelizNeftalí Feliz
Pedro Feliz
Félix Fermín
Ramón Fermín
José Fernández
Junior FernándezJulián FernándezTony Fernández
Alfredo Fígaro
Bienvenido Figueroa
Jesús Figueroa
Pedro Figueroa
Yohan Flande
Kendry Flores
Pedro FlorimónEstevan FlorialBartolomé Fortunato
Frank Francisco
Juan Francisco
Julio FrancoMaikel FrancoWander FrancoCarlos Frías
Hanley FriasLuis FríasPepe Frías
Rafael Furcal

G

Armando Gabino
Balvino Gálvez
Eddy Garabito
Frank Garcés
Amaury García
Dámaso GarcíaDermis GarcíaDeivi GarcíaEdgar García 
Freddy García
Guillermo GarcíaJarlin GarciaJosé García
Leo GarcíaLeury GarcíaLuis GarcíaLuis GarcíaLuis GarcíaReynaldo Garcia
Robel GarcíaRony GarcíaWilly GarcíaYimi GarcíaDomingo GermánEstéban Germán
Franklyn Germán
Gonzalez Germen
César Gerónimo
Jerry GilLuis GilAlexis Gómez
Carlos Gómez
Héctor Gómez
Mauro Gómez
Miguel Gómez
Roberto Goméz
Sijo Gómez 
Denny GonzálezErik GonzálezJosé González
Lariel González
Merandy GonzalezOscar GonzalezPedro González
Franklyn Gracesqui
Alfredo Griffin
 Deivy GrullónCecilio Guante
Reymin Guduan
Gabriel Guerrero
Juan Guerrero
Mario Guerrero
Pedro Guerrero
Vladimir GuerreroVladimir Guerrero Jr.Wilton Guerrero
José GuillénJandel GustaveKelvin Gutiérrez
Cristian Guzmán
Domingo Guzmán
Freddy Guzmán
Geraldo Guzmán
Joel Guzmán
Johnny GuzmánJorge GuzmánJuan GuzmánRonald GuzmanSantiago Guzmán

H

Alen HansonRonny HenríquezFélix Heredia
Wilson Heredia
Anderson Hernández
Ariel Hernández
César Hernández
Diory HernándezElier HernándezFernando Hernández
Jonathan Hernández
Manny Hernández
Marco Hernández
Pedro Hernández
Roberto Hernández
Rudy Hernández
Runelvys HernándezTeoscar HernándezElián Herrera
José Herrera
Kelvin Herrera
Rosell Herrera

J

Juan Jaime
Al JavierCristian JavierJulián Javier
Stan Javier
Domingo Jean
Williams Jerez 
D'Angelo JiménezDany JiménezEloy JiménezElvio Jiménez
José Jiménez
Juan Jiménez
Kelvin Jiménez
Luis Jiménez
Manny Jiménez
Ubaldo Jiménez
Waldis Joaquín
Félix Jorge
Félix José
Rick Joseph

KFranklyn KilomeL

Jairo LabourtDinelson LametJuan LagaresJunior Lake
Néstor Lambertus 
Rafael Landestoy
Enrique LantiguaRamón LaureanoJuan Lara
Yovanny LaraJosé LeclercManny Lee
Domingo Leyba
Robinson Leyer Luis LiberatoJosé Lima
Rufino Linares
Francisco Liriano
Nelson Liriano
Pedro Liriano
Rymer Liriano
Radhames Liz
Winston Llenas
Alberto Lois
Aquilino López
Mendy López
Pedro LópezOtto LópezReynaldo LópezElvis Luciano
Julio Lugo
Ruddy Lugo
Héctor Luna

MManny MachadoWarner Madrigal
Julio Mañón
Ramón Mañón
Josías Manzanillo
Ravelo ManzanilloManuel MargotJuan Marichal
Carlos Mármol
José MarmolejosBrailyn MárquezAlfredo Marte
Andy Marte
Dámaso Marte
Jefry MartéJosé MarteKelvin MarteKetel MarteLuis MarteStarling MarteVíctor MarteYunior MarteFrancis Martes
Norberto Martín
Anastacio Martínez
Carlos Martínez (P, born 1982)Carlos Martínez (P, born 1991)Cristhian Martínez
Domingo Martínez
Félix Martínez
José Martínez
Luis Martínez
Manny Martínez
Michael Martínez
Pablo Martínez
Pedro Martínez
Pedro Martínez Aquino
Rabbit Martínez  
Ramón Martínez
Sandy Martínez
Silvio Martínez
Ted Martínez
Víctor Mata
Henry MateoJorge MateoJuan Mateo
Julio Mateo
Marcos Mateo
Rubén Mateo
Francisco Matos
Osiris Matos
Pascual MatosNomar MazaraAdonis MedinaAdalberto MejíaFrancisco MejíaJ. C. MejíaJenrry Mejía
Miguel Mejía
Roberto Mejía
Sam Mejías
Keury Mella
Juan Melo
Adalberto Méndez
Román Méndez
Henry Mercedes
José Mercedes
Luis Mercedes
Melvin MercedesYermín MercedesJosé Mesa
Melky MesaKeynan MiddletonJuan MinayaAdalberto MondesíRaúl MondesíFrankie MontasAgustín MonteroElehuris MonteroRafael MonteroJosé MorbanChristopher MorelRamón Morel
José MorenoDauri MoretaJuan MorilloReyes MorontaAndy Mota
Danny Mota
Guillermo Mota
José Mota
Manny Mota
Arnie MuñozYairo MunozN

Yamaico NavarroHéctor NerisJuan Nicasio
Junior Noboa
Héctor Noesí
Jordan Norberto
Nelson Norman
Iván Nova
Roberto Novoa
Abraham Núñez (IF)
Abraham Núñez (OF)
Dedniel Nuñez
Eduardo Núñez
Franklin Núñez
Jhonny Núñez
José Núñez (right-handed pitcher)
José Núñez (left-handed pitcher)

O

José Offerman
Alexi OgandoCristofer OgandoNefi Ogando
José Oliva
Chi-Chi Olivo
Diomedes Olivo
Miguel Olivo
David Ortiz
José Ortiz
Luis Ortiz (2B)Luis Ortiz (P), born 1999Ramón OrtizOliver OrtegaFranquelis Osoria
Willis Otáñez
Juan Carlos OviedoMarcell OzunaPablo Ozuna

PCristian PacheJosé Paniagua
Edward ParedesEnoli ParedesJimmy Paredes
José Parra
Felipe Paulino
Ronny Paulino
Joel Payamps
Pedro Payano 
Carlos PegueroElvis PegueroFrancisco Peguero
Jailen Peguero
Julio PegueroLiover PegueroRudy Pemberton
Alejandro Peña
Ángel Peña
Ariel Peña
Carlos Peña
Elvis PeñaFélix PeñaFrancisco Peña
Gerónimo Peña
Hipólito PeñaJeremy PeñaJesús Peña
Juan Peña
Ramón Peña
Roberto Peña
Tony Peña (C)
Tony Peña (IF)
Tony Peña (P)
Wily Mo PeñaFreddy PeraltaJhonny Peralta
Joel PeraltaWandy PeraltaWily PeraltaÁngel PerdomoGeraldo PerdomoLuis PerdomoLuis Perdomo
Antonio Pérez
Audry Pérez
Beltrán Pérez
Carlos Pérez
Eury PérezFrancisco PérezJuan Pérez
Juan Carlos PérezHéctor PérezLuis Pérez
Mélido Pérez
Neifi Pérez
Odalis Pérez
Pascual Pérez
Rafael Pérez
Santiago Pérez
Timoniel Pérez
Yefri Pérez
Yorkis Pérez
Denis Phipps
Hipólito Pichardo
Félix Pie
Stolmy Pimentel
Luis PinedaMichael PinedaGregory PolancoJorge PolancoPlácido Polanco
Luis Polonia
Arquimedez Pozo
César PuelloAlbert PujolsLuis Pujols

Q

Rafael QuiricoJohan QuezadaR

Carlos Ramírez
Edwar Ramírez
Elizardo Ramírez
Elvin Ramírez
Hanley Ramírez
Héctor RamírezJosé Ramírez (IF)José Ramírez (P)
Julio Ramírez
Manny Ramírez
Rafael Ramírez
Ramón Ramírez
Santiago Ramírez
Wilkin Ramírez
Yefry RamirezYohan RamírezDomingo Ramos
Raudy Read
Al Reyes
Alex Reyes
Alexander Reyes
Argenis ReyesDenyi ReyesFranmil ReyesGilberto Reyes
José Reyes (C)
José Reyes (IF)
Pablo Reyes
Danny Richar
José RijoWebster RivasBen Rivera
Sendy Rleal
Willis RobertsHansel RoblesRafael RoblesVíctor RoblesFernando Rodney
Alex Rodríguez
Aneury Rodríguez
Eddy RodríguezElvin RodríguezFélix Rodríguez
Henry Rodríguez
Jefry RodríguezJoely RodríguezJulio RodríguezNerio Rodríguez
Rafael Rodríguez
Ricardo RodríguezRichard RodríguezRonny Rodriguez
Rubén RodríguezYerry RodríguezWandy Rodríguez
Ed Rogers
Esmil Rogers
Mel Rojas
José Román
Enny Romero
Fernando Romero
Ramón RomeroAngel RondónGilberto Rondón
Rafael Roque
Adonis Rosa 
Carlos Rosa
Alberto RosarioAmed RosarioEguy RosarioFrancisco Rosario
Mel Rosario
Randy Rosario
Rodrigo Rosario
Sandy Rosario
Víctor Rosario
Wilin RosarioRamón RossoWilkin RuanEsteury RuizS

Juan Salas
Marino SalasDanny SalazarÁngel Salomé
Amado Samuel
Juan Samuel
Pedro San 
Alejandro Sánchez
Ángel Sánchez
Miguel SánchezCristopher SánchezDuaner Sánchez
Félix SánchezGary SánchezHumberto Sánchez
Jesús SánchezJesús Sánchez OFMiguel SanchezSixto SánchezMiguel SanóAndrés SantanaCarlos SantanaDanny SantanaDennis SantanaDomingo Santana
Edgar Santana
Ervin Santana
Julio Santana
Marino Santana
Rafael Santana
Ramón SantiagoAntonio SantosFrancisco SantosGregory SantosLuis Santos
Víctor Santos
Luis SaturriaJean SeguraJosé Segura
Leyson Séptimo
Wascar SerranoAnderson SeverinoAtahualpa SeverinoLuis SeverinoPedro SeverinoMagneuris SierraMoisés SierraJosé SiriLuis Silverio
Tom Silverio
Alfredo Simón
Julio Solano
Alfonso Soriano
José Soriano
Rafael Soriano
Elías Sosa
Henry Sosa
Jorge Sosa
José Sosa
Juan Sosa
Sammy Sosa
Gregory SotoJuan SotoMario Soto
Pedro Strop
Wander Suero
William Suero

TDomingo TapiaRaimel TapiaFernando TatísFernando Tatís Jr.Ramón Tatís
Jesús Tavárez
Julián Tavárez
Alex Taveras
Frank TaverasLeody TaverasOscar Taveras
Willy Taveras
Miguel Tejada
Wilfredo Tejada
Edwin Tavarez
Anderson Tejeda
Robinson Tejeda
Amaury Telemaco
Luis Terrero
Andrés Thomas
Ángel Torres
Ramón Torres
Salomón Torres
Carlos Triunfel
Ramón Troncoso

UEdwin UcetaJosé UreñaRichard UreñaJosé Uribe
Juan Uribe

V

Jordany Valdespin
Carlos Valdez
César Valdez
Efrain ValdezFramber ValdezJosé Valdez
José Valdez
Julio Valdez
Merkin Valdez
Phillips Valdez
Rafael Valdez
Sergio Valdez
Wilson Valdez
Yohanny Valera
José Valverde
Claudio Vargas
Tetelo Vargas 
Esmerling Vásquez
Jorge Vásquez
Rafael Vásquez
Freddie Velázquez
Yordano Ventura
Darío Veras
José Veras
Quilvio Veras
Wilton Veras
José Vidal
Carlos Villanueva
Henry VillarJonathan VillarPedro Viola
Ozzie VirgilArodys VizcaínoJosé Vizcaíno
Luis Vizcaíno
Edinson Vólquez

W

Héctor Wagner
Enrique Wilson

Y

Esteban Yan
Gabriel Ynoa
Huascar Ynoa
Michael Ynoa
Rafael Ynoa

ZAneurys Zabala'References

Players Born in Dominican Republic Baseball-Reference.com''

Dominican